WZLX (100.7 FM) is a classic rock radio station in Boston, Massachusetts. This station is owned and operated by iHeartMedia. WZLX was one of America's first classic rock FM stations. Its studios are in Medford, and its transmitter is atop the Prudential Tower.

History
What is now WZLX was originally WCOP-FM, notable for being one of the first FM stations to break simulcasting with its AM partner. WCOP-FM's separate programming was initially classical music and was one of the first FM stations in the region to (briefly) broadcast in FM stereo (the station would resume stereo programming in the early 1970s).

In 1965, WCOP (AM) had become Boston's affiliate for the NBC Radio Network, and WCOP-FM would often simulcast the hourly NBC Radio newscasts. By 1969, NBC Radio's weekend series Monitor had moved from WCOP to WCOP-FM, to allow the former to broadcast more hours of country music on the weekends.

The station went through a number of format changes (and later callsign changes), including beautiful music in the late 60s until 1973, oldies (as "Total Gold 101, WCOP-FM") from 1973 to 1974), country from 1974 to 1976, album oriented rock (as WTTK, "TK101") from 1976 to 1978, beautiful music (as WHUE-FM) from 1979 to 1985, and top 40 (as WKKT, "The Cat") for a few months in 1985). In December 1984, while still a beautiful music station, WHUE-FM sought and received the WCOZ call letters formerly on 94.5; the call sign was only used for two weeks prior to becoming WKKT.

100.7 FM adopted its current format and callsign, WZLX, in mid-October 1985.  Station owners First Media Corporation hired Gary Guthrie as the architect of its classic hits format, a format aimed at people who experienced adolescence in either the 1960s and 1970s and enjoyed the music of those eras, but did not care for the then-current heavy metal or top 40 'hot hits' of the 1980s. These were people whose mindset was getting too old for AOR and top 40, but were too young for or not interested in oldies.  WZLX is considered one of the classic rock format's earliest success stories as reflected by the station's 19th to 2nd place climb in the Adults 25-54 demographic in its first ratings period.

In 1986, Guthrie spread his concept of the format to other radio stations he consulted and Bill Smith was hired to be the station's program director and morning personality. Guthrie would return in 1990 for an additional on-site stint to repair the station's ratings.

A series of ownership changes made WZLX a part of Cook-Inlet Radio, then Infinity Broadcasting in late 1992. Infinity was renamed CBS Radio in December 2005.

In 1997, WZLX radio host George Taylor Morris created a media frenzy about the "Dark Side of the Rainbow" phenomenon, in which Pink Floyd's album The Dark Side of the Moon is said to synch up with the movie The Wizard of Oz.

In 2005, WZLX, along with sister stations WBMX and WODS, were rumored to flip to CBS Radio's ever-expanding "Jack FM" format. Had WQSX (now WEEI-FM) not flipped to the format as "93.7 Mike FM" on April 14, WZLX might have flipped to the format the next day as 100.7 Jack FM.

In the spring of 2007, WZLX became the first station in the country to broadcast programming in full digital 5.1 surround sound.  This flagship effort coincides with the recent move of the industry to implement the HD Radio format.

From 1991 to 2007, the station had its studios on the 24th floor of the Prudential Tower in downtown Boston, the location of its transmitter. On March 3, 2007, the station moved crosstown to the facility where sister stations WODS and WBCN are clustered in the CBS studios in Brighton. The transmitter is still atop the Prudential Tower.

On February 2, 2017, CBS Radio announced it would merge with Entercom (which locally owned WEEI, WEEI-FM, WKAF, WRKO and WAAF). On October 10, CBS Radio announced that as part of the process of obtaining regulatory approval of the merger, WZLX would be one of sixteen stations that would be divested by Entercom, along with sister stations WBZ and WBZ-FM, as well as WRKO and WKAF (WBMX, WODS, WEEI AM and FM, and WAAF would be retained by Entercom, while WBZ-FM was traded to Beasley Broadcast Group in exchange for WMJX). On November 1, iHeartMedia announced that they would acquire WZLX, WBZ (AM), WRKO, and WKAF. To meet ownership limits set by the FCC, iHeart placed WKOX into the Ocean Stations Trust in preparation for a sale to a permanent buyer. The merger was approved on November 9, 2017, and was consummated on the 17th. iHeart then began operating WZLX, WBZ, and WKAF under a local marketing agreement. The sale of WZLX, WRKO, WKAF, and WBZ to iHeart was completed on December 19, 2017.

Programming/personalities
There have been a few morning shows on the station in recent history. With the coming of Howard Stern to WBCN in the early 1990s, the Boston legend Charles Laquidara and his show, The Big Mattress, took up residence at WZLX. With Charles's retirement, the short-lived Mornings with Tai and Steve Sweeney eventually gave way to Steve Sweeney's Neighborhood, (co-hosted by Lance Norris) which ended a 5-year run in 2005. Longtime morning team Karlson and McKenzie took over on August 1, 2005.

Barry Scott and The Lost 45s retro radio show was a Sunday night staple (he was also the marketing and promotions director there from its inception until 1992).

Sports conflict broadcasts

Beginning in October 2013, WZLX carried Boston Celtics games that conflicted with Boston Bruins games. Games were produced by sister station WBZ-FM (which is the flagship for both teams). In addition, some Bruins games conflicting with WBZ-FM's New England Patriots broadcasts aired on WZLX starting in 2011 (previously, WBZ served this function). Celtics and Bruins broadcasts were dropped from WZLX following the sale to iHeartMedia, which separated the station from WBZ-FM (now owned by the Beasley Broadcast Group). As of April 2020, conflicting Bruins games now air on WBOS, while conflicting Celtics games now air on WROR-FM.

WZLX HD2
WZLX previously aired an all-blues format on its HD2 subchannel called "Radio Mojo". On December 19, 2017, WZLX-HD2 began simulcasting sister talk radio station WRKO.

WZLX HD3
WZLX previously aired a freeform rock format on its HD3 subchannel called "WBCN" which continued the name of the former Boston AOR station. On January 29, 2016, WZLX-HD3 switched to an adult standards format as "The Lounge". After the sale of the station to iHeart was completed on December 19, 2017, the HD3 channel was removed. In early March 2020, the HD3 channel was reopened and started simulcasting the K-Love Radio Network under a lease agreement with EMF Broadcasting. In 2021, the lease ended, and the HD3 programming was changed to a simulcast of another sister talk radio station, WXKS.

Notable on-air staff
 Karlson, McKenzie and Heather
 Carter Alan
 Chuck Nowlin
 Kenny Young

References

External links

Classic rock radio stations in the United States
ZLX
Radio stations established in 1948
1948 establishments in Massachusetts
IHeartMedia radio stations